Send-e Bala (also Romanized as Send-e Bālā) is a village in Rud Pish Rural District, in the Central District of Fuman County, Gilan Province, Iran. At the 2006 census, its population was 952, in 255 families.

References 

Populated places in Fuman County